Seok Jong-gu (born 23 February 1944) is a South Korean boxer. He competed in the men's featherweight event at the 1964 Summer Olympics.

References

1944 births
Living people
South Korean male boxers
Olympic boxers of South Korea
Boxers at the 1964 Summer Olympics
Place of birth missing (living people)
Featherweight boxers